Lovehatetragedy is the third overall and second major label studio album by the American rock band Papa Roach. It was released on June 18, 2002.

Background
A re-recorded version of the song "M-80 (Explosive Energy Movement)" was featured in the game Amplitude. The song "She Loves Me Not" was featured in the game NHL 2003. The songs "She Loves Me Not" and "Walking Thru Barbed Wire" were recorded in 1999, with the former appearing on the band's 1999 demo and the latter on the ...Let 'Em Know! EP. 

In comparison to their prior album, Infest, the band aimed to incorporate less rapping, and more singing in Lovehatetragedy. Lovehatetragedy is Papa Roach's last album under DreamWorks Records, before signing to Geffen in 2003. Alongside with Infest, a debut vinyl edition of the album was released on September 8, 2017.

Commercial performance
The album debuted at number two on the Billboard 200 by selling approximatively 136,000 copies in its first week, behind Eminem's The Eminem Show. Lovehatetragedy was mostly well received by music critics, gaining an average score of 75 on Metacritic.

It achieved a gold certification in the U.S for exceeding 500,000 copies sold in the first two months. As of 2009, sales stood around 700,000 copies. Despite peaking at higher positions on most international charts, "Lovehatetragedy" failed to catch the success of Infest both in lifetime sales and chartrun (15 weeks within the Billboard 200). It was also certified Gold in Canada and in the UK and has sold over 3,000,000 copies worldwide.

Track listing

Bonus tracks

UK edition

Personnel
Papa Roach
 Jacoby Shaddix – lead vocals 
 Jerry Horton – guitar, backing vocals 
 Tobin Esperance – bass, backing vocals 
 Dave Buckner – drums

Charts

Weekly charts

Year-end charts

Certifications

References

Papa Roach albums
DreamWorks Records albums
2002 albums